Rhithrodytes agnus is a species of beetle in family Dytiscidae. It is endemic to Portugal.

References

Endemic arthropods of Portugal
Beetles of Europe
Dytiscidae
Taxonomy articles created by Polbot
Beetles described in 1993